Meziadin Lake Provincial Park  is a provincial park in British Columbia, Canada.

References
BC Parks webpage

Provincial parks of British Columbia
Nass Country
Lakes of British Columbia
1987 establishments in British Columbia
Protected areas established in 1987